Slaughter Beach is an Indie pop band, formed in Odense, Denmark. The band comprises Nikolaj Westi, Mads Emil Aagaard and Hasse Mydtskov.

History 
The band released their first tracks "Made-Up True Love" and "Spinning Globe" in 2013, via their SoundCloud page. In 2015 their track "Nuked" appeared  and later that year their debut-EP "Love/Venice" was released.
In 2016 they premiered the tracks "Glaze", and "Shere Khan", which are to be a part of their new EP "Heroic Dose". In September, 2016 their single "The Mo" was released.

Musical style and Influences 
Slaughter Beach's music has been described as a mixture between Lo-fi, Indie and Pop music. According to indie music and rap blog Pigeons and Planes "Slaughter Beach draws on rock influences like Beach House, Girls (band), MGMT, and The Strokes to create a sound that expands upon today’s prevailing sounds and brings a little grunginess back into the fold".

References

Danish pop music groups
Musical groups established in 2013
2013 establishments in Denmark